Jovan the Serb of Kratovo (1526–1583) or Protopop Jovan (Протопоп Јован) was a Serb Orthodox priest and scribe with an opus of six works, of which one is the Velika Remeta Gospel (1580). He was a monk at Hilandar.

Life 
Little is known about his life. He first appears in 1526 when he transcribed a prayer book in which he is desperate about the end of the world coming in near future. Until 1569 he lived in Kratovo, at the time an important town and mining center, where he was a priest (pop). After that date we find him in Craiova in Wallachia where in 1580 he signed one Evangelion as “Priest Jovan, a Serb from the town of Kratovo” (Srbin od mesta Kratova). In Wallachia he is also mentioned as protopop, "archpriest". Migrations of revered men of church to Wallachia were not uncommon in those days, since there they would find patronage from Christian princes or rich landowners, a strata that did not exist in the Ottoman Empire.

Priest Jovan's work coincided with two important events. One was the renewal of the Serbian Patriarchate of Peć in 1557 that gave impetus to larger artistic production. The second was the restoration of Ottoman interest in mining, the fact that boosted production in Kratovo and other important mines.

We know that he used glasses.

Work 
Jovan of Kratovo is the most distinguished illuminator from the circle of 16th century Balkan artists that worked under the influence of Islamic ornamentation. Today there survive ten of his illuminated manuscripts and they are to be found in libraries in Belgrade, Sofia, Bucharest and in the monasteries of Hilandar and Zographouon Mount Athos, .

Jovan's new decorative system combined Byzantine and Islamic ornamentation in a new whole. Though he was not a skillful drawer of figures, his captions and specific floral ornamentation were noted and widely copied. He is justly credited as the creator of this new style that continued until end of the 17th century. The same style was propagated mostly by his pupils from the so-called Kratovo school.

Not much before year 1580 he designed, transcribed and illuminated Law on Mines of Despotes Stefan Lazarević, a collection of medieval Serbian mining regulations. This was, in all probability, an order by local authorities of Kratovo, needed to renew their production according to the wants of the Ottoman administration. In this book Islamic influence is reflected in its elongated format, arabesque on its cover, narrow size of letters and, of course, in its vignettes. The picture of a miners’ council is a copy from an older, 15th century original.

Works
Velika Remeta Gospel (1580)
The Four Gospels (четворојеванђеље), held at Sofia, Bulgaria
Mining Code transcript, held at Belgrade, Serbia

See also
Gavrilo Kratovac, prota in Hilandar and translator from Greek to Serbian
Jakov of Serres
Stanislav of Lesnovo
Teodosije the Hilandarian (1246-1328), one of the most important Serbian writers in the Middle Ages
Elder Grigorije (fl. 1310-1355), builder of Saint Archangels Monastery
Antonije Bagaš (fl. 1356-1366), bought and restored the Agiou Pavlou monastery
Lazar the Hilandarian (fl. 1404), the first known Serbian and Russian watchmaker
Pachomius the Serb (fl. 1440s-1484), hagiographer of the Russian Church
Miroslav Gospel
Gabriel the Hilandarian
Constantine of Kostenets
Cyprian, Metropolitan of Kiev and All Rus'
Gregory Tsamblak
Isaija the Monk
Elder Siluan
Romylos of Vidin
Atanasije (scribe)
Rajčin Sudić
Nicodemus of Tismana
Dimitar of Kratovo
Anonymous Athonite

References

Sources

Further reading

16th-century Serbian people
16th-century writers
16th-century Christian monks
Serbian writers
Serbian Orthodox clergy
Serbian abbots
People from Kratovo, North Macedonia
1526 births
1583 deaths
16th-century people from the Ottoman Empire